Hanna Amon is a 1951 German Agfacolor drama film directed by Veit Harlan and starring Kristina Söderbaum, Lutz Moik and Ilse Steppat. It was shot at the Göttingen Studios and on location in Upper Bavaria. The film's sets were designed by the art directors Hans Berthel and Rochus Gliese. It was the second film after Immortal Beloved (also 1951) in a post-war comeback by director Harlan and his wife Söderbaum, who remained controversial figures due to their association with the Nazi era. Both films were major commercial hits, despite calls for a boycott.

Synopsis 
Hanna and her brother Thomas Amon live on the estate of their deceased parents. While Hanna of local veterinary and Thomas Brunner of the mayor's daughter is secretly admired and sought after, the siblings have eyes only for each other. Thomas, however, forfeited the much older, seductive Vera Colombani, a castle owner. He follows her (his sister, defying the warnings) to the south, where they spend the winter. Thomas is dropped in the wake of the Colombani and returns repentant return to the home farm. But when he meets again with his former lover, he triggers a disaster the Colombani and eventually fall victim to Hanna.

Cast
 Kristina Söderbaum as Hanna Amon
 Lutz Moik as Thomas Amon
 Ilse Steppat as Vera Colombani
 Hermann Schomberg as  Alois Brunner
 Susanne Körber as  Rosl, Tochter des Bürgermeisters
 Elise Aulinger as Frau Brunner
 Hedwig Wangel as Frau Zorneder
 Hans Hermann Schaufuß as Bürgermeister
 Emmy Percy-Wüstenhagen as 	Bürgermeisterin 
 Brigitte Schubert as Lioba
 Günther Hadank as Pfarrer
 Wolf Ackva as Entresser
 Franz Schafheitlin as Gefängnisdirektor
 Jakob Tiedtke as Wirt
 Ferdinand Anton as Hans Zorneder 
 Caspar Harlan as 	Hannes

References

Bibliography
 Baer, Hester. Dismantling the Dream Factory: Gender, German Cinema, and the Postwar Quest for a New Film Language. Berghahn Books, 2012.
 Halle, Randall & McCarthy, Margaret. Light Motives: German Popular Film in Perspective. Wayne State University Press, 2003.
 Noack, Frank. Veit Harlan: The Life and Work of a Nazi Filmmaker. University Press of Kentucky, 2016.

External links 

 Hanna Amon bei Deutscher Tonfilm.de

1951 films
1951 drama films
German drama films
West German films
1950s German-language films
Films about siblings
1950s German films
Films shot at Göttingen Studios
Films shot in Bavaria
Films directed by Veit Harlan